Spring Grove is a historic home located at Mount Holly, Westmoreland County, Virginia. It was built in 1834, and is a two-story, five-bay, brick farmhouse. The interior features pattern book inspired Greek Revival and Federal style woodwork and plasterwork. The front facade features a pedimented tetrastyle portico in an Ionic order. Also on the property are a contributing smokehouse and kitchen.

It was listed on the National Register of Historic Places in 1985.

References

External links

Houses on the National Register of Historic Places in Virginia
Federal architecture in Virginia
Greek Revival houses in Virginia
Houses completed in 1834
Houses in Westmoreland County, Virginia
National Register of Historic Places in Westmoreland County, Virginia
Historic American Buildings Survey in Virginia